The 2021 Daniil Medvedev tennis season officially began on 2 January 2021, with the start of the ATP Cup.

The season saw him win his first grand slam at the 2021 US Open where he defeated then-world No. 1 Novak Djokovic in the final to deny him the calendar-year Grand Slam.

Yearly summary

Early hard court season

ATP Cup

Australian Open

All matches
This table chronicles all the matches of Daniil Medvedev in 2021.

Singles matches

Schedule

Singles schedule

Yearly Records

Head-to-head matchups

Top 10 wins

Finals

Earnings
Bold font denotes tournament win

 Figures in United States dollars (USD) unless noted. 
source：2021 Singles Activity
source：2021 Doubles Activity

See also
 2021 ATP Tour
 2021 Rafael Nadal tennis season
 2021 Novak Djokovic tennis season
 List of Grand Slam men's singles champions
 Sport in Russia

Notes

References

External links 
 ATP tour profile

Medvedev
2021 in Russian sport